Dallenbach is a surname. Notable people with the surname include:

Wally Dallenbach Jr. (born 1963), American NASCAR driver and commentator, son of Wally Dallenbach Sr.
Wally Dallenbach Sr. (born 1936), American Indy car driver
Robert Barney Dallenbach (born 1927), American bishop of the Pillar of Fire Church